Najib Balala (born 20 September 1967) is a Kenyan politician, the former Cabinet Secretary for Tourism, and the immediate former. He traces his ancestral origin to the hadhrami people of Yemen. M.P. for Mvita Constituency. He has been the party leader of The Republican Congress Party of Kenya (RC), that was a partner of the Jubilee Coalition.

Early life and education
Balala attended Serani Boys primary school, and Kakamega High School, a national school. He studied Business Administration and International Urban Management and Leadership at the University of Toronto, and the John F. Kennedy School of Government at Harvard University.

Experience and career
Prior to venturing into public life, Najib Balala worked in private sector tourism, and eventually joined a family tea and coffee trading business
Secretary of The Swahili Cultural Centre (1993–1996)
Chairman of Coast Tourist Association (1996–1999)
Mayor of Mombasa (1998–1999)
Chairman, Chamber of Commerce and Industry (Mombasa Chapter) (2000–2003)
Member of Parliament for Mvita Constituency (27 Dec 2002 – 15 Dec 2007)
Minister for Gender, Sports, Culture and Social Services (7 Jan 2003 – 31 June 2004)
Acting Minister for Labour (Jan – June 2003)
Minister for National Heritage (31 June – 21 Nov 2005)
Member of Parliament for Mvita Constituency (27 Dec 2007 – 15 Jan 2013)
Chairman of the UNWTO Executive Council (11 Nov 2011 – March 2012)
Minister for Tourism (17 Apr 2008 – 26 March 2012)
Cabinet Secretary for Mining (15 May 2013 – June 2015)
Cabinet Secretary for Tourism (June 2015 to 2022)

Politics
Balala began his political career as the Mayor of Mombasa, Kenya. He was then elected to a Mvita parliamentary seat in the 2002 general elections. Prior to that, Balala served as vice-chairman of Kenya Tourism Board (KTB), Chairman of All Local Government Association of Kenya, and Chairman of Mombasa and Coast Tourist Association.

Balala was the longest serving Minister for Tourism, a position he held from the beginning of 2008 until 26 March 2012, when he was dismissed during a cabinet reshuffle. He formed The Republican Congress Party of Kenya (RC) in April 2012 that became a principal partner in the Jubilee Coalition with President Uhuru Kenyatta (TNA), William Samoei Ruto (URP), and Charity Ngilu (Narc).

As Cabinet Secretary for Mining he has revoked licenses issued by the previous government. He has been accused of corruption by Cortec Mining for requesting a bribe of nearly $1 million for the reissuing of the license.

Honors and awards
 Silver Star Medal by President
 E.G.H (Elder of Golden Heart) Medal by President
 Africa Tourism Minister 2009.
 Best African Minister for Tourism 2010.
 Vice-president UNWTO World Tourism Organization
 Chairman UNWTO World Tourism Organization.
 World Travel and Tourism Council WTT Global Champion.

References

 http://www.najibbalala.com/home.html
 https://web.archive.org/web/20170718210926/http://www2.unwto.org/

External links

 
 Scribd account
 http://sabahionline.com/en_GB/articles/hoa/articles/newsbriefs/2013/08/06/newsbrief-07
 http://www.corruptionwatch.org.za/content/dont-bow-bribery-demands-officials

1967 births
Living people
Government ministers of Kenya
People from Mombasa
Hadhrami people
Kenyan Muslims
Kenyan people of Yemeni descent
Alumni of Kakamega School
United States International University alumni